David Nelson (8 September 1962 – 22 July 2001) was an English professional rugby league footballer who played in the 1980s and 1990s.

Background
David Nelson worked in engineering. He was shot and murdered aged 38 in the Wilson's Arms public house, Moresdale Lane, Seacroft, Leeds.

Playing career

Challenge Cup Final appearances
David Nelson played , i.e. number 5, in Castleford's 12-28 defeat by Wigan in the 1992 Challenge Cup Final during the 1991–92 season at Wembley Stadium, London on Saturday 2 May 1992, in front of a crowd of 77,386.

County Cup Final appearances
David Nelson played , i.e. number 5, in Castleford's 26-6 victory over Bradford Northern in the 1991–92 Yorkshire County Cup Final during the 1991–92 season at Elland Road, Leeds on Sunday 20 October 1991, in front of a crowd of 8,916.

Club career
David Nelson was transferred from Sheffield Eagles to Castleford on 27 August 1991.

References

External links
David Nelson Memory Box Search at archive.castigersheritage.com
Man remanded over rugby star shooting
Man jailed for shooting rugby star
Former rugby league star shot dead in pub attack
Ex-rugby star shot dead next to children's party 
'Gambling debts' of pub gun victim 
Trinity Murder - Hitman Caged For Life
Killed By A Silent Assassin
Who Paid Grinning Hitman?
The two friends who were gunned down in cold blood

1962 births
2001 deaths
2001 murders in the United Kingdom
Castleford Tigers players
Deaths by firearm in England
English murder victims
English rugby league players
Huddersfield Giants players
Male murder victims
People murdered in England
Rugby league players from Leeds
Rugby league wingers
Sheffield Eagles players
Wakefield Trinity players